Penha de França is a town in Bardez, Goa in India. It is north of the capital Panjim in North Goa. It takes its name from the patroness of its church, Nossa Senhora da Penha de França which it shares with Penha de França in Lisbon. It is the birthplace of writer Vimala Devi.

Demographics
, Penha de França had a population of 15,375. Males constitute 53% of the population and females 47%. Penha de França had an average literacy rate of 81%, higher than the national average of 59.5%: male literacy was 83%, and female literacy was 78%. In Penha de França, 10% of the population is under six years of age.

References

Cities and towns in North Goa district